Ikechukwu Vincent Ezenwa (born 16 October 1988) is a Nigerian professional footballer who currently plays as a goalkeeper for Katsina United F.C.

Club career
Ezenwa began his football professional career with Ocean Boys before moved to Heartland FC in July 2008.
He moved to Ifeanyi Ubah FC in 2016. Contract End in 2017. He has then completed a move to Enyimba
. Contract End in 2018. He moved on to join Katsina United on 1 January 2019. One of his respected goalkeeper trainer who impacted greatly to his career is former Sunshine Stars Coach, Daramola Nicholas Akinsehinwa between the year 2013 to 2016 during his playing time with Sunshine Stars F.C. and this great development to his potentials made the Nigeria Super Eagles call-up possible by which Ikechukwu Ezenwa was part of the Nigeria squad at the 2014 World Cup.

International career
He was a member of the Nigeria U-23 at the 2008 Summer Olympics, featuring in the qualifier games.
He got the call up to the Nigeria Super Eagles in 2015 under the authority of Coach Sunday Oliseh. Following the injury of Nigeria's first choice goalkeeper Carl Ikeme he was called up to be part of the squad in the World cup and Nations cup qualifications by Super Eagles coach Gernot Rohr and given the number 1 jersey replacing Ikeme as first choice goalkeeper of the Super Eagles.

Ezenwa showed some class of keeping during Nigeria's back to back matches against the ‘indomitable lions’ of Cameroon in the 2018 FIFA World Cup qualifiers. In May 2018, he was named in Nigeria's preliminary 30 man squad for the 2018 World Cup in Russia.

Career statistics

International
Statistics accurate as of match played 30 June 2019.

References

External links

Player Profile

1988 births
Living people
People from Yenagoa
Nigerian footballers
Association football goalkeepers
Footballers at the 2008 Summer Olympics
Olympic footballers of Nigeria
Olympic silver medalists for Nigeria
Heartland F.C. players
Nigeria international footballers
Nigeria under-20 international footballers
Sunshine Stars F.C. players
Ocean Boys F.C. players
Sharks F.C. players
Olympic medalists in football
Medalists at the 2008 Summer Olympics
Footballers at the 2016 Summer Olympics
2018 FIFA World Cup players
Ifeanyi Ubah F.C. players
Enyimba F.C. players
Nigeria Professional Football League players
2019 Africa Cup of Nations players
2016 African Nations Championship players
Nigeria A' international footballers
2018 African Nations Championship players